Bleu Nuit (English: "Midnight Blue") is a television series that was broadcast late night on the Télévision Quatre Saisons, or TQS, television network (now called Noovo) in Quebec, Canada, from 1986 until 2007. The content of the series was softcore pornography, mostly European films. The series was popular with both francophones and anglophones living in Quebec, as well as in other provinces in Canada that received the network. Bleu Nuit was considered a part of Quebec culture.

Films shown on Bleu Nuit 
Beau-père (1981) Note: very first film shown on Bleu Nuit as it was shown on September 13, 1986, 6 days after the launch of TQS.
 Black Emanuelle, White Emanuelle (1976)  Note: Italian Version of Emmanuelle with one "M". Stars Laura Gemser
 Black Emanuelle 2 (1976)
 Les Branches a Saint-Tropez
 Coups de Matraque avec Cynthia
 Dernier Tango a Paris
 Deux femmes en or
 Emmanuelle I, Emmanuelle II, Emanuelle III, Emmanuelle IV
 Emmanuelle & The White Slave Trade (1978); Note: memorable sex scene in Africa with mechanic under car hoist.
 L'Enchainee (Italy 1985)
 Equateur (shown 9 June 1990)
 Fanny Hill (shown 21 July 1990)
 La Femme flambee
 Hôtel Exotica
 Je t'aime moi non plus
 La Bonne 
 La Chiave (Tinto Brass film with Italian actress Stefania Sandrelli)
 Loulou
 La Vie secrète de Roméo et Juliette
 Le Gigolo (1960, France)
 Le journal de désirs
 L'été en pente douce (1987, France)
 Malizia (by Salvatore Samperi, with Laura Antonelli)
 Malena (2000) Monica Bellucci seduces a young man. The film is set in Sicily in 1940 during World War II just as Italy enters the war. Malena's husband, who left to join the military is presumed dead and she is seduced by a young man.
 La Seconda Moglie Italian actress Maria Grazia Cucinotta stars in this film based in early 1960s, a Sicilian single mother marries an older, crass widowed truck driver. When he is arrested trying to smuggle an antique, she ends up falling in love with her handsome stepson.
Neuf semaines et demie
 On se calme et on boit frais à Saint-Tropez
 Paprika (Tinto Brass erotic film)
 Raspoutine (softcore version of Rasputin-Orgien am Zarenhof)
Rendez-vous
 Rosa la rose, fille publique (France, 1985)
 Samanka Ile des Passions
 Tarzan l'Homme Singe 
 Tendres Cousines (1980) - The most talked about erotic film in Canada that appeared on Bleu Nuit in 1987 with the famous "Touche Les" scene. In the summer of 1939 in Provence, France: the 14-year-old Julien has a crush on his cousin Julia, who lives together with his family in their small hotel. Julien has a famous barn house scene with a much older woman who asks him to touch her breasts: 'Touche les'.
 Y Tu Mamá También - Abandoned by their girlfriends for the summer, rich teenagers Tenoch and Julio meet older woman Luisa at a wedding. Trying to impress Luisa, the friends tell her they are headed on a road trip to a beautiful, secret beach.
 Die heissen Nächte der Josefine Mutzenbacher (1981)
 Wild Orchid

Television series shown on Bleu Nuit 

Série rose
 Super Sexy

See also
 The Baby Blue Movie, a softcore programming block that aired on Citytv in Ontario
 Cinérotique, a softcore programming block that aired on CFVO-TV in Quebec

References 

Television shows filmed in Quebec
Noovo original programming
Pornographic television shows
Canadian late-night television programming
1980s Canadian anthology television series
1990s Canadian anthology television series
Canadian motion picture television series